Spokane, Portland and Seattle Railway Class L-1 was a class of 4-4-0 steam locomotives built in 1889 by Schenectady Locomotive Works.

References 

L-1
4-4-0 locomotives
Schenectady Locomotive Works locomotives
Steam locomotives of the United States
Standard gauge locomotives of the United States
Railway locomotives introduced in 1889